Erik Duijvelshoff (born 15 April 1972) is a Dutch short track speed skater. He competed in two events at the 1994 Winter Olympics.

References

External links
 

1972 births
Living people
Dutch male short track speed skaters
Olympic short track speed skaters of the Netherlands
Short track speed skaters at the 1994 Winter Olympics
Sportspeople from Amsterdam
20th-century Dutch people